François Sébastien Letourneux (1752–1814) was a French lawyer and politician who was Minister of the Interior under the Directory.

Life
François Sébastien Letourneux was born in Saint-Julien-de-Concelles, Brittany, in 1752.
He practiced as an advocate before the French Revolution.
He was appointed Attorney for the Loire-Inférieure department in 1791.
On 23 Fructidor year V (14 September 1797) he was named Minister of the Interior. He replaced François de Neufchâteau, who had been appointed a member of the Directory.
He held this position until 30 Messidor year VI (17 June 1798), when Neufchâteau returned to his position as Minister of the Interior on 2 Thermidor year VI.

Letourneux, who was inexperienced in national politics, was responsible for enforcing the new republican calendar, with its ten-day weeks. 
This included finding ways to ensure the calendar was adopted, while holding back over-zealous local officials who wanted, for example, to close churches on the old Sundays and religious holidays. Such church closures would be in conflict with the principle of tolerance of all religions.
Under Letourneux's administration the Directory issued the decree of 27 Brumaire Year VI in support of public education, and the decree of 17 Pluviôse year VI requiring special supervision of private educational establishments.

In year VII Letourneux was elected to the Council of Ancients.
After 18 Brumaire he entered the judiciary.
He died as a judge in 1814.

Bibliography

References
Citations

Sources

1752 births
1814 deaths
People from Loire-Atlantique
French interior ministers
Members of the Council of Ancients
18th-century French lawyers
19th-century French judges